Zaytsevo may refer to:

 Zaytsevo, Leningrad Oblast, a village in Leningrad Oblast, Russia
 Zaytsevo, name of several other rural localities in Russia

See also
 Zaytsev, a surname